Platanthera oreophila is a species of plant in the family Orchidaceae. It is endemic to Yunnan Province of China.

References

Orchids of Yunnan
Endemic flora of Yunnan
Endemic orchids of China
oreophila
Vulnerable plants
Taxonomy articles created by Polbot